Jean Carolus (Brussels, 1814 – 1897, Paris), a Belgian painter of genre scenes and interiors, spent much of his life living and working in France. Noted for his depictions of figures set within interior scenes, he is esteemed for the high degree of finish and jewel-like quality attained in these works.

Life and work
Jean Carolus, born and raised in Belgium, was a protege of François-Joseph Navez, Director of the Académie Royale des Beaux-Arts in Brussels. Carolus, however, spent most of his life in France, where between 1855 and 1880 he painted prolifically; portraying elegantly attired aristocrats often engaged in pursuits of a leisurely nature. The artist chose the subject matter of his paintings with great care, focusing primarily of representations of people in the 18th century; French interiors and garden scenes. His style characteristically combines a luminous color palette with the expressive grace and elegance of his meticulously rendered figures.

One of his most celebrated works entitled La partie de billard sous Louis XV (A Game of Billiards under Louis XV), 1855, oil on canvas, 75 x 96 cm, can be seen at In Flanders Fields Museum.

Gallery

References

1814 births
1897 deaths
Artists from Brussels
Realist painters
Genre painters
Belgian painters
Belgian genre painters
19th-century French painters
French male painters
19th-century French male artists